Neoblechnum is a genus of ferns in the family Blechnaceae, subfamily Blechnoideae, with a single species Neoblechnum brasiliense, according to the Pteridophyte Phylogeny Group classification of 2016 (PPG I). The genus is accepted in a 2016 classification of the family Blechnaceae, but other sources sink it into a very broadly defined Blechnum, equivalent to the whole of the PPG I subfamily; the species is then known as Blechnum brasiliense. It is called Brazilian dwarf tree fern, red Brazilian tree fern, and red dwarf tree fern.

Description
The new foliage is a striking deep red color. As the fronds mature it turns to a glossy green. On some selections, the new fronds emerge a pinkish-red.

Distribution
The fern is native to the warm and humid subtropical forests of South America.

Habitats include:
 the Atlantic Forest biome, within southeastern Brazil, Uruguay, and the interiors of Argentina and Paraguay.  
 the Amazon region, in Brazil, Peru, Bolivia, Colombia, Ecuador, Venezuela, and Guyana.
 Guatemala.

Cultivation
Neoblechnum brasiliense is cultivated as an ornamental plant. In cultivation in the UK (under the synonym Blechnum brasiliense) it has gained the Royal Horticultural Society's Award of Garden Merit. 
As it will not tolerate temperatures below  it must be grown under glass all year in temperate regions.

Cultivars
Named cultivars include:
 'Crispum' — segments have prominently crisped margins
 'Cristatum' — segments are crested
 'Volcano' — red dwarf tree fern, new foliage is red

Gallery

References

External links

Blechnaceae
Monotypic fern genera